21795 Masi, provisional designation , is a Nysian asteroid from the inner regions of the asteroid belt, approximately  in diameter. It was discovered on 29 September 1999, by Italian amateur astronomer Franco Mallia at the Campo Catino Astronomical Observatory in Lazio, Italy. The likely S-type asteroid has a rotation period of 13.86 hours. It was named for Italian astronomer Gianluca Masi.

Orbit and classification 

Masi is member of the Nysa family, located in the Nysa–Polana complex and one of the largest asteroid families of the asteroid belt, named after 44 Nysa. It orbits the Sun in the inner main-belt at a distance of 1.9–2.8 AU once every 3 years and 8 months (1,342 days; semi-major axis of 2.38 AU). Its orbit has an eccentricity of 0.19 and an inclination of 2° with respect to the ecliptic. The body's observation arc begins with a precovery published by the Digitized Sky Survey and taken at the Palomar Observatory in April 1954, more than 45 years prior to its official discovery observation at Campo Catino.

Physical characteristics 

Masi is an assumed, stony S-type asteroid, which is also the overall spectral type for members of the Nysa family of asteroids.

Rotation period 

In September 2010, a rotational lightcurve of Masi was obtained from photometric observations in the R-band by astronomers at the Palomar Transient Factory in California. Lightcurve analysis gave a rotation period of 13.862 hours with a relatively high brightness amplitude of 0.68 magnitude.

Diameter and albedo 

According to the survey carried out by the NEOWISE mission of NASA's Wide-field Infrared Survey Explorer, Masi measures 3.150 kilometers in diameter and its surface has an albedo of 0.235, while the Collaborative Asteroid Lightcurve Link assumes a standard albedo for a stony asteroid of 0.20, and calculates a diameter of 2.45 kilometers based on an absolute magnitude of 15.42.

Naming 

This minor planet was named after Italian astrophysicist and astronomer, Gianluca Masi (born 1972), a researcher and discoverer of minor planets and variable stars, who became an avid amateur astronomer when he was 8 years old. The official naming citation was published by the Minor Planet Center on 9 May 2001.

References

External links 
 Asteroid Lightcurve Database (LCDB), query form (info )
 Dictionary of Minor Planet Names, Google books
 Discovery Circumstances: Numbered Minor Planets (20001)-(25000) – Minor Planet Center
 
 

021795
Discoveries by Franco Mallia
Named minor planets
19990929